Clyde Coffman (June 2, 1911 – March 4, 2001) was an American athlete. He competed in the men's decathlon at the 1932 Summer Olympics where he finished in 7th place. Coffman was also the national pentathlon champion in 1935, and was inducted into the Kansas Athletics Hall of Fame in 2008.

References

External links
 

1911 births
2001 deaths
Athletes (track and field) at the 1932 Summer Olympics
American male decathletes
Olympic track and field athletes of the United States
People from Ford County, Kansas
Track and field athletes from Kansas